The Ireland Wolves cricket team (Ireland A) toured South Africa to play five unofficial Twenty20 International matches (with Twenty20 status) and two unofficial One Day International matches (with List A status) against the Namibian national team. Ireland Wolves won the T20 series 4–1. The List A series was won 2–0 by Namibia. Ireland Wolves finished their tour with a 50-over friendly match against a Northern Titans Invitation XI.

Unofficial T20I series

1st Unofficial T20I

2nd Unofficial T20I

3rd Unofficial T20I

4th Unofficial T20I

5th Unofficial T20I

Unofficial ODI series

1st Unofficial ODI

2nd Unofficial ODI

Other 50-over match

References

External links
 Series home at ESPN Cricinfo

2020 in Irish cricket
2020 in Namibian cricket